Rajoo Dada is a 1992 Indian Hindi-language film directed by D. S. Azaad. The film stars Mithun Chakraborty, Vijayendra Ghatge, Kajal Kiran, Neeta Mehta in lead roles. Even though the film was censored in 1990, it had a theatrical release only in 1992.

Plot
Rajesh is a CBI officer whose father and mother was killed by Daku Jawala on a Diwali night. Rajesh's smaller brother Rakesh, a Police Inspector was brought up by Police Commissioner while  Rajesh himself was brought up by Col Tanej. Jawala now is a smuggler and lives in Mumbai as a businessman with another smuggler Vikram. Ultimately two brothers finally catch him when Jawala tries to triple cross Vikram and kills him.

Cast
 
Mithun Chakraborty as CBI Officer Rajesh / Rajoo Dada
Vijayendra Ghatge as Inspector Rakesh
Kajal Kiran as Lily 
Neeta Mehta as Bijli 
Raza Murad as Vikram
Kader Khan as Jwala Daku 
Shreeram Lagoo as Colonel Taneja
Chand Usmani as Rakesh's Foster Mother
Mohan Choti - 
Yunus Parvez as Police Constable
Chandrashekhar as Police Inspector  
Mushtaq Khan as Police Inspector
Sumithra as an item number

Reception

The film was a late release after lying on cans for almost 10 years.

References

External links

1992 films
1990s Hindi-language films